LandSpace Technology Corporation (doing business as LandSpace) is a Chinese private space launch provider based in Beijing. It was founded in 2015 by Zhang Changwu.

LandSpace developed its first launch vehicle Zhuque-1, powered by solid-propellant motors. Zhuque-1 was launched on 27 October 2018, however the payload failed to reach orbit due to an issue with the third stage. The company also developed the liquid-fueled Zhuque-2, based on its methalox TQ-11 and TQ-12 engines, whose maiden launch (failed to orbit) occurred in December 2022.

Launch vehicles

Zhuque-1 

Zhuque-1 (ZQ-1, Chinese：朱雀一号 or 朱雀·南太湖号), also called LandSpace-1 or LS-1 (the name LandSpace-1 or LS-1 was originally reserved for a different rocket that did not in the end materialize; after cancellation of the rocket, the name LandSpace-1 was then affiliated to LandSpace's rocket-to-be-developed at the time, the Zhuque-1), is a -tall, three-stage solid-propellant rocket. All stages have a diameter of 1.35 m. It is likely based on the DF-26 missile's rocket motor.

The maiden flight of Zhuque-1 was on 27 October 2018 from a mobile platform at the Jiuquan Satellite Launch Center, carrying Weilai-1 satellite for China Central Television. After a successful first- and second-stage firing, and fairing separation, the payload failed to reach orbit due to an issue with the third stage. Zhuque-1 was the first Chinese private orbital rocket to attempt an orbital launch.

According to news reports, the manufacturer of the solid rocket motors has ended its contract with LandSpace. This raised doubts as to whether there will be a second flight of Zhuque-1.

Zhuque-2 
LandSpace developed a liquid-fuelled rocket called Zhuque-2 (ZQ-2). Zhuque-2 is a medium-sized rocket powered by liquid oxygen and methane capable of lifting 4,000 kg of payload into a 200 km low Earth orbit, or 2,000 kg of payload into a 500 km Sun-synchronous orbit. The rocket was initially planned to be launched in 2020, however by 2019 this had slipped to 2021, and later to December 2022.

Zhuque-2 has a liftoff weight of 216 metric tons and use 4 TQ-12 methalox engines on the first stage each with a thrust of 67 metric tonnes. The second stage utilizes one vacuum optimised TQ-12 with a thrust of 80 metric tonnes in combination with an 8 metric tonnes thrust TQ-11 engine which acts as a vernier thruster.

In May 2019, LandSpace performed test firings of its liquid methane and LOX fuelled TQ-12 rocket engine at its test facility at Huzhou, Zhejiang province. LandSpace's head of research and development, Ge Minghe, says the engine has a thrust of 80 tonnes. The Huzhou facility will be able to produce about 15 ZQ-2 rockets and 200 TQ-12 engines starting in 2022, according to CEO, Zhang Changwu.

On 14 December 2022, LandSpace conducted the debut flight of Zhuque-2, but failed to reach orbit due to an early shutdown of its second stage vernier engines after the second stage main engines apparently completed a successful burn. It was the world's first orbital launch attempt by a methane-fueled launch vehicle.

Marketplace 
LandSpace is in competition with several other Chinese space rocket startups, being LinkSpace, Galactic Energy, ExPace, i-Space, OneSpace and Deep Blue Aerospace.

References

External links 
 Official website: 蓝箭官网

Aerospace companies of China
Commercial launch service providers
Companies based in Beijing
Transport companies established in 2015
Chinese companies established in 2015